The following is a list of video transcoding software.

Open-source

Shutter Encoder (Windows, OS X, Linux)
DVD Flick (Windows)
FFmpeg (Windows, OS X, Linux)
HandBrake (Windows, OS X, Linux) 
Ingex (Linux)
MEncoder (Windows, OS X, Linux)
Nandub (Windows)
Thoggen (Linux)
VirtualDubMod (Windows)
VirtualDub (Windows)
VLC Media Player (Windows, Mac OS X, Linux)
Arista (Linux)
Avidemux (Windows, OS X, Linux)

Freeware

Freemake Video Converter (Windows)
FormatFactory (Windows)
Ingest Machine DV (Windows)
MediaCoder (Windows)
SUPER (Windows)
Windows Media Encoder (Windows)
XMedia Recode (Windows)
Zamzar (Web application)
ZConvert (Windows)

Commercial

Compressor (Mac OS X)
MPEG Video Wizard DVD (Windows)
ProCoder (Windows)
QuickTime Pro (Mac OS X, Windows)
Roxio Creator (Windows)
Sorenson Squeeze
Telestream Episode (Mac OS X, Windows)
TMPGEnc (Windows)
Wowza Streaming Engine with included Wowza Transcoder feature (Linux, Mac OS X, Windows)
Zamzar - Premium service (Web application)
Zencoder (Web application)

See also

Photo slideshow software
List of video editing software

Video transcoding software